Corral Hollow, formed by Corral Hollow Creek, is a canyon partially located in Alameda County, with parts in San Joaquin County,  southwest of Tracy, California.

History

Etymology
El Camino Viejo, the oldest route between Los Angeles and San Francisco, passed to the west through the canyon then known as El Arroyo de los Buenos Ayres over the Portezuela de Buenos Ayres (Pass of Good Winds) to the Arroyo Seco and the Livermore Valley.  The '49ers traveled through the canyon now named Corral Hollow on their way to the gold fields, as did the first mail to the Tuolumne mines.  The name change was perhaps because at its mouth there was a large corral for catching wild horses.  This "caral" was mentioned in the California Star on March 18, 1848:
"We are credibly informed...that a number countrymen with several Californians are actively engaged in building an extensive caral, or enclosure, in the valley of the river San Joaquin, for the purpose of capturing wild horses.  The caral...will enclose twenty-five acres of land..."

However, the name of the creek did not change for some time.  The name "Arroyo Buenos Ayres" appears on Charles Drayton Gibbes' "Map of the Southern Mines" in 1852. An 1857 map of California shows the canyon was named Corral Hollow, but Buenos Ayres Creek, although anglicised, remained with its old name. By 1873, a State Geological Survey map indicated the name change was complete to Corral Hollow Creek and Corral Hollow Pass.

Early settlements 
California Historical Landmark #755 indicates the site of the home of its first settler, Edward B. Carrell, which was built here at the former site of an Indian village. The men and animals received food and drink at Wright's Zink House, five hundred yards north of the landmark site.
California Landmark #755 (now missing) was located 1.5 miles west of I-580 on County Hwy J2, Corral Hollow Road. (Coordinates on this page mark that site.)

Carnegie and Tesla 
Some miles up the Corral Hollow Road in the canyon is the site of the former town of Carnegie.  A few miles on, beyond the Alameda County line where the road becomes the Tesla Road, is the site of coal mining that began in 1855, and later was the site of the former mining town of Tesla. Tesla appeared in 1889, as the San Francisco & San Joaquin Coal Company built the Alameda and San Joaquin Railroad line to the coal mines.  When clay was discovered in the coal mine, the Carnegie Brick and Pottery Company was formed in 1902, and its plant built four miles east of Tesla, to make brick and terra cotta.  In 1904, the Pottery sewer pipe plant was built between Carnegie and Tesla.  Carnegie became a town with a population of about 300; Tesla had a population of over 1200.  The towns were abandoned after a 1911 flood, which destroyed the railroad and workings and the Company could not afford to rebuild.  The rail line from Carbona was abandoned by the Western Pacific Railroad in January 1916.  99 years after the abandonment of the town, the unrelated Tesla Factory began operating about 20 miles west of the location of the former town.

Upper Canyon 
The canyon turns to the southwest beyond the site of Tesla and ascends into the hills back into San Joaquin County.  After passing the site of Tesla, the Tesla Road turns northwestward and winds up the side of a canyon into the Corral Hollow Pass and crosses over to the Arroyo Seco, and follows it as it descends into the Livermore Valley.

Today 
Today the former town site of Tesla (named after Nikola Tesla in 1897 by San Francisco millionaire John Treadwell) is within the Carnegie State Vehicular Recreation Area. The Carnegie town site partly within the Recreation Area; the rest is on the hillside on the north side of the Tesla Road where it intersects Carnegie Ridge Road.

References

External links
Tesla 1905 1:62,500 from Perry–Castañeda Library, Map Collection, California Topographic Maps Topographic Map shows the extent and location of the buildings of the towns in the Corral Hollow before the flood.

Former settlements in Alameda County, California
Former settlements in San Joaquin County, California
Diablo Range
San Joaquin Valley
Former populated places in California
Populated places established in 1850
El Camino Viejo
Valleys of San Joaquin County, California
Valleys of Alameda County, California
Valleys of California